Jos Alukkas group is Indian jewelry retailing group in Southern India. It is based in Thrissur, Kerala, India. The group was bifurcated from the Thrissur-based group Alukkas Jewellery in 2001. The company has branches all over five states in the region. 

Jos Alukkas, the Chairman of the group today, set the foundation for Jos Alukkas Jewellery in the year 1964. Over the last 55 plus year, the brand has grown from a small establishment in Kerala’s Thrissur district to a globally recognised and certified jewellery brand. Today, the Group is led by Chairman Jos Alukkas and the team of next generation Varghese Alukkas, Paul J. Alukkas and John Alukkas, who are the Managing Directors.

In 2010, the group signed Tamil actor Vijay to be their brand ambassador for Kerala and Tamil Nadu while Telugu actor Mahesh Babu endorses them in the state of Andhra Pradesh.In 2021, the group signed actress Keerthy Suresh as its new brand ambassador.

Stores and locations 

They have nearly 45 stores that are spread across six states and one union territory in South India.

Incidents and controversies 

 In 2021 there was a major burglary that took place at Vellore branch of the jeweler.

See also 

 Joy Alukkas

References

Jewellery retailers of India
Retail companies of Thrissur
2001 establishments in Kerala
Indian companies established in 2001
Retail companies established in 2001